The 1980 Kentucky Wildcats football team represented the University of Kentucky in the Southeastern Conference (SEC) during the 1980 NCAA Division I-A football season.  In their eighth season under head coach Fran Curci, the Wildcats compiled a 3–8 record (1–5 against SEC opponents), finished in eighth place in the SEC, and were outscored by their opponents, 280 to 167.  The team played its home games in Commonwealth Stadium in Lexington, Kentucky.

The team's statistical leaders included Larry McCrimmon with 1,060 passing yards, Randy Brooks with 578 rushing yards, and Alan Watson with 536 receiving yards.

Schedule

References

Kentucky
Kentucky Wildcats football seasons
Kentucky Wildcats football